Interstate Airlines was a charter airline based in Maastricht, Netherlands. It operates wet lease services within Europe. Its main base was Maastricht Aachen Airport.

There was also a U.S.-based Interstate Airlines which was a cargo air carrier operating Boeing 727-100, Douglas DC-8-62 and Lockheed L-188 Electra freighter aircraft.

History
The airline based the Netherlands was founded by Nico Hemmer and Roberto Stinga - former founder and CEO of Air Exel and V Bird - and started operations in July 2005. It has 25 employees (at March 2007). It went bankrupt in 2010.

Scheduled Destinations
 Germany
Düsseldorf - Düsseldorf Airport
 Morocco
Nador - Nador International Airport
 Netherlands
Amsterdam - Amsterdam Schiphol Airport

Fleet 
The Interstate Airlines fleet consisted of the following aircraft (as of 8 January 2009)

16 ATR 42-500

References

External links
Interstate Airlines (Domain for sale as of 18 July 2021)
Interstate Airlines Fleet

Defunct airlines of the Netherlands
Airlines established in 2005
Airlines disestablished in 2009
Defunct charter airlines
Dutch companies established in 2005
Dutch companies disestablished in 2009